The Thorsborne Trail is a popular long-distance bushwalking trail in Queensland. It has been described as "iconic" by Australian Geographic  and one of the best multi-day hiking trails across Australia by The Guardian. The track is accessed by private ferry services to/from Ramsay Bay (from Cardwell) or George Point (from Lucinda) – the schedule varies based on tides.

A maximum of 40 hikers per day are permitted along the track.  Wet weather in the summer months can make creek crossings more difficult.  The track is not graded and is rough in parts.

The trail begins at Ramsay bay and finishes at George point, only 3km from the port of Lucinda.

History
Margaret Thorsborne, and her husband Arthur Thorsborne, were Australian naturalist, conservationist and environmental activist who are commemorated by the Thorsborne Trail.

References

External links 
 parks.des.qld.gov.au – Queensland National Parks Website 
 queensland.com – Queensland Tourism Website 
 Thorsborne Trail track notes

Hiking and bushwalking tracks in Australia
Cassowary Coast Region